Melanie is a feminine given name.

Melanie may also refer to:

Music

Albums
 Affectionately Melanie, album by Melanie Safka originally released as Melanie
 Melanie (album), by Celine Dion

Songs
 "Melanie" (song), by "Weird Al" Yankovic
 "Melanie", by Donna Summer on the album I'm a Rainbow
 "Melanie", by Guster on the album Goldfly
 "Melanie", by Toto on the album Mindfields

Other uses
 Melanie (singer) (Melanie Anne Safka-Schekeryk, born 1947), American pop singer
 Mélanie (rocket), a French rocket engine
 Melanie (film), a Canadian film